Edward or Ed Clark may refer to:

Politicians
 Ed Clark (born 1930), American politician, Libertarian presidential candidate in 1980
 Edward Clark (Australian politician) (1854–1933), Australian politician
 Edward Clark (governor) (1815–1880), American politician, Governor of Texas
 Edward Clark (Canadian politician) (born 1932), Canadian politician
 Edward A. Clark (1906–1992), United States Ambassador to Australia, 1965–1968
 Edward Henry Clark (1870–1932), New Zealand politician

Sports
 Ed Clark (baseball) (Edmund C. Clark, 1863–1927), American baseball player
 Nobby Clark (cricketer) (Edward Winchester Clark, 1902–1982), English cricketer

Others
 Edward Clark (actor) (1878–1954), Russian-born American actor and songwriter
 Edward Clark (architect) (1822–1902), American architect, Architect of the Capitol, 1865–1902
 Edward Clark (artist) (1926–2019), American abstract painter
 Edward Clark (conductor) (1888–1962), British conductor and BBC music producer
 Ed Clark (photographer) (1911–2000), Life magazine photographer
 Edward Cabot Clark (1811–1882), American businessman, co-founder of the Singer Sewing Machine Company
 Edward Severin Clark (1870–1933), his grandson, American builder
 Edward Walter Clark Jr. (1858–1946), commodore of the Philadelphia Corinthian Yacht Club and senior partner in the E. W. Clark & Co. investment house
 Edward White Clark (1828–1904), head of E. W. Clark & Company, a financial firm in Philadelphia, Pennsylvania
 Edward William Clark (born 1946), American Roman Catholic bishop
 Edward Winter Clark (1830–1913), American missionary in Nagaland, India
 Edward Clark Carter (1878–1954), American educator
 Edward Walter Clark III (1885–1939), investment banker
 G. Edward Clark (1917–1984), American ambassador

See also
 Edward Clarke (disambiguation)
 Edwin Clark (disambiguation)
 Edgar E. Clark (1856–1930), American attorney, government and union official
 Edmund Clark, British photographer